Melaleuca atroviridis is a plant in the myrtle family, Myrtaceae and is endemic to the south-west of Western Australia. It was formerly included in the species Melaleuca uncinata but a review of that species lead to the identification of a number of new species. Like M. uncinata, this species is used for the production of brushwood fencing. It has fewer stamens in the flowers and somewhat smaller clusters of fruit but has the same needle-like leaves with a hooked end and spikes of creamy yellow flowers in early summer.

Description
The ends of the leaves taper to a hook.

The flowers are a cream or yellow and arranged in spikes containing 5 to 27 groups of flowers in threes. The stamens are arranged in five bundles of around the flower, with 7 to 11 stamens in each bundle. The flowering season lasts from December to February and is followed by fruit which are woody capsules. The fruits become so closely packed together that they lose their individual identities and form a cylinder  in diameter.

Taxonomy and naming
Melaleuca atroviridis was first formally described in 2004 by Lyndley Craven and Brendan Lepschi in Australian Systematic Botany from a specimen collected near Goomalling. The specific epithet (atroviridis) is from the Latin ater meaning "black" and viridis meaning "green", referring to the dark green colour of the foliage of this species.

Distribution and habitat
This melaleuca occurs in and between the Coorow, Perenjori, Wubin, Yellowdine, Beaufort River, Pingrup and Varley districts in the Avon Wheatbelt, Coolgardie, Esperance Plains, Geraldton Sandplains, Jarrah Forest, Mallee, Murchison and Yalgoo bieogeographic regions. It grows in woodland, shrubland and samphire on a range of soils and on saline sites, including those on degraded land.

Conservation status
This species is classified as "not threatened" by the Government of Western Australia Department of Parks and Wildlife.

Uses
Melaleuca atroviridis is one of the species used in the production of brushwood fencing and is sometimes cultivated for that purpose.  Tests have shown that it grows well in sand that is saline but not so well on salt affected loam or clay.

References 

atroviridis
Myrtales of Australia
Plants described in 2004
Endemic flora of Western Australia
Taxa named by Lyndley Craven